Andamarca (from Quechua Anta Marka, meaning "copper village") is one of fifteen districts of the Concepción Province in Peru.

Geography 
Other mountains are listed below:

References